Maxime Ouellet (born June 17, 1981) is a Canadian former professional ice hockey goaltender who played in the National Hockey League (NHL) for the Philadelphia Flyers, Washington Capitals and Vancouver Canucks from 2000 to 2006. He also played several years in the American Hockey League, retiring in 2009. Internationally he played for the Canadian national junior team at both the 2000 and 2001 World Junior Championships, winning a bronze medal each year.

Playing career

As a youth, Ouellet played in the 1994 and 1995 Quebec International Pee-Wee Hockey Tournaments with a minor ice hockey team from Beauport, Quebec City.

Ouellet was drafted by the Philadelphia Flyers in the first round, 22nd overall at the 1999 NHL Entry Draft. He later was traded with a first, second, and third round draft choice in 2002 NHL Entry Draft to the Washington Capitals for Adam Oates. He holds several records for the former AHL affiliate of the Washington Capitals, the Portland Pirates. On December 2, 2005, the Washington Capitals traded Ouellet to the Canucks in exchange for a fifth round selection in the 2006 NHL Entry Draft (Maxime Lacroix).

After not playing to start the 2006–07 season, in late December 2006, Ouellet was signed by the Portland Pirates to goal tend alongside Dov Grumet-Morris. One week later in January 2007, he left Portland without playing a game and was reportedly trying to sign with a European team. In January 2007, Ouellet signed to a contract with the German hockey club Kassel Huskies.

Ouellet was signed by the New York Islanders to a minor-league contract with the Bridgeport Sound Tigers on July 26, 2007. After failing to make the team, he signed a contract on November 11, 2007, with the Salzburg Red Bulls of the Erste Bank Eishockey Liga in Austria.

On January 24, 2008, Ouellet signed a contract with the Mississippi Sea Wolves of the ECHL. He was traded from the Sea Wolves to the Trenton Devils where he played 5 games with a 3.21 GAA and a 0.877 save percentage.

On October 16, 2008, it was announced that Ouellet had signed with the St. Marie Poutrelles Delta of the LNAH.

Career statistics

Regular season and playoffs

International

References

External links
 

1981 births
Canadian expatriate ice hockey players in Germany
Canadian ice hockey goaltenders
Hershey Bears players
Ice hockey people from Quebec City
Kassel Huskies players
Living people
Manitoba Moose players
National Hockey League first-round draft picks
Philadelphia Flyers draft picks
Philadelphia Flyers players
Philadelphia Phantoms players
Portland Pirates players
Quebec Remparts players
Rouyn-Noranda Huskies players
Trenton Devils players
Vancouver Canucks players
Washington Capitals players